Give Blood is the debut album from the Brighton-based band, Brakes. The album was recorded onto 2" tape and mixed onto 1/4" tape in January 2005. Brakes and their 22-year-old producer, Iain Gore, also removed all computer screens from the studio for the week and all the tracks were recorded live, with the duets being recorded around one mike. The only overdubs were lap steel on "Jackson" by bassist Marc Beatty, piano by drummer Alex White and guitar by Tom White on "I Can't Stand To Stand Beside You".

The album also features Matt Eaton of Actress Hands on "The Most Fun", Liela Moss of The Duke Spirit on "Jackson" and Rose, Becki and Julia of The Pipettes on "Sometimes Always".

The album was voted best of 2005 by the prestigious indie music shop Rough Trade.

Track listing
All songs by Brakes except where noted.
"Ring a Ding Ding"
"NY Pie"
"The Most Fun"
"Heard About Your Band"
"What's in It for Me?" (Hamilton/Farmer/Eaton/Gray, arr. by Brakes)
"You'll Always Have a Place to Stay"
"Cheney"
"I Can't Stand to Stand Beside You"
"Pick Up the Phone"
"You're So Pretty"
"Jackson" (Jerry Leiber & Billy Edd Wheeler)
"All Night Disco Party"
"Hi How Are You"
"Comma Comma Comma Full Stop"
"Sometimes Always" (William Reid)
"Fell in Love with a Girl"

Personnel

Brakes
 Eamon Hamilton – vocals, guitar
 Marc Beatty – bass guitar, lapsteel
 Thomas White – electric guitar, percussion
 Alex White – drums, piano

Other musicians
 Matt Eaton – backing vocals on "The Most Fun"
 Liela Moss – duet vocals on "Jackson"
 Rose Elinor Dougall, Rebecca Stephens, Julia Clarke-Lowes – duet vocals on "Sometimes Always"

Technical
 Iain Gore, Brakes – producer, mixing
 Tim Young – mastering
 Matt Paul, Fergus McHugh, Carlos Olmos – assistant engineering

References

2005 debut albums
Brakes (band) albums